Two ships of the United States Navy have been named Advocate.

  was a small fishing sloop captured from the Confederates on 1 December 1861.
  was a minesweeper launched on 1 November 1942 and transferred to the Soviet Union under Lend-Lease

Sources
 

United States Navy ship names